Scythocentropus scripturosa is a moth of the family Noctuidae. It is found in Pakistan, Turkmenistan, southern Russia and Kazakhstan.

References

Moths described in 1854
Hadeninae